Asad Mehmood is a Pakistani politician who has been a member of the National Assembly of Pakistan since August 2018. He is serving as the chairman of the standing committee of the National Assembly of Pakistan on Religious Affairs and Inter-faith Harmony. He is an alumnus of Khair al-Madaris and the current Chancellor of Jamia Qasim Ul Uloom.

Personal life
Asad is the son of Fazal-ur-Rehman and grandson of Mufti Mahmood, who was against the creation of Pakistan and was one of many who called the founder of Pakistan "Kafir-e-Azam" which literally translates to "Kafir of the nation" He graduated from Khair al-Madaris. He is the Chancellor of Jamia Qasim Ul Uloom in Multan.

Political career
He was elected to the National Assembly of Pakistan as a candidate of Muttahida Majlis-e-Amal (MMA) from Constituency NA-37 (Tank) in 2018 Pakistani general election. He received 28,504 votes and defeated Habib Ullah Khan Kundi, a candidate of Pakistan Tehreek-e-Insaf. Following his successful election, MMA nominated him for the office of Deputy Speaker of the National Assembly of Pakistan. On 15 August 2018, he lost the office to Qasim Suri. He is Chairman of Standing Committee of National Assembly of Pakistan on Religious Affairs and Inter-faith Harmony. He took oath as a federal minister for Communications and Postal Services in Shahbaz Sharif Cabinet.

References

Living people
Pakistani MNAs 2018–2023
Muttahida Majlis-e-Amal MNAs
Year of birth missing (living people)
Jamia Khairul Madaris alumni
People from Lakki Marwat District
Jamia Qasim Ul Uloom people